National Defense Force or National Defence Force may refer to:
Burundi National Defence Force, the military of Burundi
Ethiopian National Defense Force, the military of Ethiopia
Maldives National Defence Force, the military and security forces of the Maldives
South African National Defence Force, the military of South Africa
National Defense Force (Syria), a Syrian pro-government militia
Jatiyo Rakkhi Bahini, a paramilitary force operating in Bangladesh from 1972 to 1975